Callum Maycock (born 23 December 1997) is an English footballer who plays as a midfielder for Solihull Moors.

Career
Maycock made his professional debut coming on as a substitute on 6 November 2016 in a 1–1 FA Cup draw with Morecambe, coming on to replace Andre Wright.

On 30 July 2018, Maycock was loaned out to Macclesfield Town until January 2019. The deal was later extended for the remainder of the season.

Career statistics

References

External links
Callum Maycock player profile at ccfc.co.uk

1997 births
Living people
English footballers
Footballers from Birmingham, West Midlands
Association football midfielders
Coventry City F.C. players
Macclesfield Town F.C. players
Leamington F.C. players
Solihull Moors F.C. players
English Football League players
National League (English football) players